Saravanan is a Tamil male given name. Due to the Tamil tradition of using patronymic surnames, it may also be a surname for males and females. It is one of the names of the Hindu god Murugan.  It may refer to:

Saravanan (actor)
M. Saravanan (film producer)
M. Saravanan (film director)
Mariappan Saravanan (1972–1999), Indian Army officer
Saravanan Murugan (born 1968), Tamil Malaysian politician
Saravanan Meenatchi, Tamil soap opera on Vijay TV
Pudhukottaiyilirundhu Saravanan, 2004 Tamil film
Sakthi Saravanan, Indian cinematographer
V. Saravanan (born 1978), former Malaysian football player
Govindasamy Saravanan (born 1970), Malaysian race walker
Tiruchy L. Saravanan, flute player
Saravanan Engira Surya, a 2015 Tamil film
Senthil Kumar (born 1978), Indian film and television actor also known as Mirchi Saravanan
Suriya (born 1975), Tamil actor whose real name is Saravanan Sivakumar,
 Saravanan Michael Ramalingam (1971–1996), Singaporean murder victim.
 Vishnu Saravanan (born 1999), Indian sailor
Saravanan movie name Ratsasan 2018 as triple role Christopher Fernandez, Mary Fernandez & Annabella George

References

Tamil masculine given names